Major-General the Honourable Sir William Lambton, KCB, CMG, CVO, DSO (4 December 1863 – 11 October 1936) was a British Army officer who commanded the 4th Division during the First World War.

Military career
Born the son of George Lambton, 2nd Earl of Durham he was educated at Eton College and the Royal Military College Sandhurst.

Lambton was commissioned a lieutenant in the Coldstream Guards on 6 February 1884, promoted to captain on 18 May 1892, and became aide-de-camp to the Governor General of Ireland in 1895, before he served with the Egyptian Army. He took part in the Nile expedition of 1898 and fought at the Battle of Atbara and the Battle of Omdurman, and was promoted to major on 29 September 1898.

Following the outbreak of the Second Boer War in late 1899, his battalion was sent to South Africa. As part of the Kimberley Relief Force, he was present at the Battle of Magersfontein on 10–11 December 1899, in which the defending Boer force defeated the advancing British forces amongst heavy casualties for the latter. Lambton was mentioned in the despatch from Paul Methuen, who described the battle and how Lambton had refused to be carried off the battlefield despite being wounded. After his recovery, he served as Military Secretary to the Commander-in-Chief of the Transvaal, and was Military Secretary to Alfred Milner, High-Commissioner for Southern Africa, from December 1900, with the local rank of lieutenant colonel. He was appointed commanding officer of 1st Bn Coldstream Guards in 1912, Assistant Adjutant and Quartermaster-General for London District in 1913 and Military Secretary to the Commander-in-Chief of the British Expeditionary Force at the beginning of the European War before becoming General Officer Commanding 4th Division in 1915. He retired in 1920.

Family
In 1921, he married Lady Katherine de Vere Somerset, née Beauclerk, daughter of William Beauclerk, 10th Duke of St Albans; they had no children.

References

1863 births
1936 deaths
British Army generals of World War I
Knights Commander of the Order of the Bath
Companions of the Order of St Michael and St George
Commanders of the Royal Victorian Order
Companions of the Distinguished Service Order
People educated at Eton College
Graduates of the Royal Military College, Sandhurst
Younger sons of earls
William
British Army major generals
British Army personnel of the Second Boer War